The Men's downhill competition was the final event of the FIS Alpine World Ski Championships 1970, held on Sunday, 15 February.

Results

References

Men's downhill
1970